Malaybalay, the capital of Bukidnon, is subdivided into 46 barangays. The Philippine Standard Geographic Code classifies 15 barangays as urban and 31 rural; however, the City of Malaybalay classifies 18 barangays as urban and 28 rural. These barangays are grouped into five administrative districts, namely Basakan, North Highway, Poblacion, South Highway, and Upper Pulangi.

Barangays by district

Basakan District 

Basakan District is composed of ten barangays.

North Highway District 
The North Highway District is the largest in terms of land area and is composed of nine barangays. However, Sumpong is usually grouped within Poblacion because of its proximity to the district.

Poblacion District 

It is the city center of Malaybalay and is subdivided into eleven barangays.

South Highway District 
It is the most populous district in the city, composed of eight barangays.  Casisang is usually grouped with the Poblacion District because of its proximity.

Upper Pulangi District 
Upper Pulangi is located on the east of the city along the Pulangi River. It is composed of eight barangays.

Defunct Barangays 
Defunct barangays are those historically integrated as a regular barrio of Malaybalay but was later dissolved to form part of another barangay or were merged to form a new barangay. This has been the case of Barangay Poblacion where it was dissolved to form twenty new barangays and then reorganized to form the current eleven barangays of the Poblacion District. In 1972, then Mayor Timoteo Ocaya implemented the subdivision of Barangay Poblacion, including Impalambong, by virtue of Presidential Decrees no. 86, 86A, and 210. This created twenty new barangays from Poblacion, based on the purok system, where purok leaders were appointed as provisional Barangay Chairmen. The system proved to be cumbersome and unwieldy which led to the Municipal Council of Malaybalay to pass Ordinance No. 87 in 1974, downsizing the number of barangays to eleven. New borders were drawn such that some of the barangays are merged, parceled out to other barangays, or split. Impalambong, a sitio of Poblacion, was split into Barangay 18, Barangay 19, and Barangay 20 in 1972. By 1974, the new ordinance redesignated Barangay 18 as Barangay 10 and merged Barangay 19 and Barangay 20 to form Barangay 11. In the town proper, Barangay 1 and Barangay 6 were merged to form Barangay 1; Barangay 13, Barangay 14, and Barangay 17 were merged to form Barangay 7; Barangay 15 was dismembered to form parts of the present-day Barangay 6 and Barangay 8. The current designation (i.e. number) of barangays of Poblacion District was not necessarily designated as the number it was originally assigned in 1972. Furthermore, the dissolution of Barangay Poblacion in 1972 and its subsequent reorganization in 1974 led to the creation of the Administrative District of Poblacion when Malaybalay was converted into a city in 1998.

Former Barangays 
Malaybalay used to be larger and comprised roughly the area of the present-day Second Congressional District of Bukidnon except for Impasug-ong and the southern half of San Fernando. Throughout the 1950s to the 1970s, some of the far-flung, populated barrios of Malaybalay were separated from it to form part of a new municipality. These barangays now form part of the municipalities of San Fernando (1959), Valencia (1961), Lantapan (1968), and Cabanglasan (1979). The chart below lists the barrios formerly part of Malaybalay but are now part of other local government units.

References 

Barangays of Bukidnon
Barangays